Vincent W. Kosuga (January 17, 1915 – January 19, 2001) was an American onion farmer and commodity trader best known for manipulating the onion futures market. Public outcry over his practices led to the passing of the Onion Futures Act, which banned the trading of futures contracts on onions.

Personal life
The son of a Russian Jew who converted to Catholicism, Kosuga was a devout Catholic. He donated a significant amount of his fortune to the church, and was rewarded with private audiences with three popes.

Kosuga carried a .38 caliber pistol and a billy club with him at all times. He drove stock cars in his spare time and was a licensed pilot. He once survived a plane crash near Oswego, New York when the plane he was flying ran out of fuel mid-flight. He was left in a body cast after the crash, but made a quick recovery.

Farming
Born and raised in Pine Island, New York, Kosuga owned a  black dirt farm where he grew onions, celery, and lettuce. His customers included the U.S. Army and Campbell's soup. He also began trading wheat futures. After an unsuccessful stint trading in which he was brought to the brink of bankruptcy, Kosuga withdrew from commodity trading and at his wife's insistence focused on farming full-time.

Commodity trading
Kosuga was unable to leave trading behind permanently, however, and returned to the commodity market where he began trading onion futures. At the time, onions futures contracts were the most traded product on the Chicago Mercantile Exchange, accounting for 20% of its trades in 1955.

He soon began splitting his time between New York and Chicago, where he traded on the Chicago Mercantile Exchange several days a week. In Chicago, he was a very successful trader. He lavished expensive gifts upon his brokers, buying them each a new Buick one year. One of his brokers eventually rose to the position of Chairman of the exchange.

Kosuga sometimes used deceptive practices to manipulate the futures market. He once bribed a weather bureau to issue a frost warning in order to inflate the price of futures contracts that he owned. The weather bureau did issue the warning, though the temperature never fell below .

Cornering the onion market
With his partner Sam Seigel, a fellow onion trader and owner of a local produce company, Kosuga embarked upon a scheme to corner the onion futures market. In the fall of 1955, Seigel and Kosuga bought enough onions and onion futures so that they controlled 98 percent of the available onions in Chicago. Millions of pounds of onions were shipped to Chicago to cover their purchases. By late 1955, they had stored  of onions in Chicago. They soon changed course and convinced onion growers to begin purchasing their inventory by threatening to flood the market with onions if they did not. Seigel and Kosuga told the growers that they would hold the rest of their inventory in order to support the price of onions.

As the growers began buying onions, Seigel and Kosuga purchased short positions on a large amount of onion contracts. They also arranged to have their stores of onions reconditioned because they had begun to spoil. They shipped them outside of Chicago to have them cleaned and then repackaged and re-shipped back to Chicago. The new shipments of onions caused many futures traders to think that there was an excess of onions and further drove down onion prices in Chicago. In August 1955, the same quantity of onions had been priced at $2.75 a bag. So many onions were shipped to Chicago in order to depress prices that there were onion shortages in other parts of the United States.

Seigel and Kosuga made millions of dollars on the transaction due to their short position on onion futures. At one point,  of onions were selling in Chicago for less than the bags that held them. This drove many onion farmers into bankruptcy. A public outcry ensued among onion farmers who were left with large amounts of worthless inventory. Many of the farmers had to pay to dispose of the large amounts of onions that they had purchased and grown.

Regulatory action
In the aftermath of the crash, many commentators characterized Kosuga's actions as unprincipled gambling. Kosuga was defiant, replying to his critics: "If it's against the law to make money... then I'm guilty". The abrupt change in prices gained the attention of the Commodity Exchange Authority. Soon they launched an investigation and the U.S. Senate Committee on Agriculture and House Committee on Agriculture held hearings on the matter.

Kosuga testified before Congress, and defended his practices under questioning from members of the committee. During the hearings, the Commodity Exchange Authority stated that it was the perishable nature of onions which made them vulnerable to price swings. Then-congressman Gerald Ford of Michigan sponsored a bill, known as the Onion Futures Act, which banned futures trading on onions. The bill was unpopular among traders, some of whom argued that onion shortages were not a crucial issue since they were used as a condiment rather than a staple food. The president of the Chicago Mercantile Exchange, E. B. Harris, lobbied hard against the bill. Harris described it as "burning down the barn to find a suspected rat". The measure was passed, however, and President Dwight D. Eisenhower signed the bill in August 1958.

After the ban was passed, the Chicago Mercantile Exchange filed a lawsuit in federal court alleging that the ban unfairly restricted trade. After a federal judge ruled against them, they declined to appeal to the Supreme Court and the ban stood.

Later life
After the futures market was reformed, Kosuga returned to New York full-time and focused on his local business interests and philanthropy. Kosuga opened a restaurant next to his farm called The Jolly Onion Inn, where he served as a chef. The Jolly Onion Inn (later known as Ye Jolly Onion Inn) became one of the most popular restaurants in Orange County.

He became well respected for his philanthropy, and in 1987 was named Pine Island Citizen of the Year by the Pine Island Chamber of Commerce. The Pine Island Chamber of Commerce did not mention Kosuga's manipulation of the onion market in their announcement of his award, nor the other onion farmers his misadventures put out of business. The Pine Island Chamber of Commerce's mission is to increase profits for businesses in the community, as it is not a charity nor a philanthropic organization. After Kosuga died, his widow, Polly Kosuga (1915–2009), continued his philanthropy.

References

Bibliography

External links
Text of the Onion Futures Act
Planet Money episode on NPR, "The Tale of the Onion King"

1915 births
2001 deaths
American commodities traders
Farmers from New York (state)
American financiers
American investors
American Roman Catholics
American people of Russian-Jewish descent
Businesspeople from Chicago
Businesspeople from New York (state)
People from Orange County, New York
20th-century American businesspeople